Michel Celestino Pires Chaves (born 25 June 1989) is a Brazilian footballer who plays for Alagoinhas Atlético Clube as a midfielder.

He played with Los Cabos of the Liga de Balompié Mexicano during the league's inaugural season in 2020–21.

References

External links

Fotbolltransfers profile

Michel Pires at ZeroZero

1989 births
Living people
Footballers from Rio de Janeiro (city)
Brazilian footballers
Association football midfielders
Allsvenskan players
Campeonato Brasileiro Série C players
Campeonato Brasileiro Série D players
Liga MX players
Liga de Balompié Mexicano players
Madureira Esporte Clube players
Macaé Esporte Futebol Clube players
GIF Sundsvall players
Club Atlético Zacatepec players
Mineros de Zacatecas players
Associação Desportiva Cabofriense players
Esporte Clube Novo Hamburgo players
Associação Atlética Santa Rita players
Sociedade Esportiva do Gama players
Associação Portuguesa de Desportos players
Sampaio Corrêa Futebol e Esporte players
Nacional Futebol Clube players
Alagoinhas Atlético Clube players
Brazilian expatriate footballers
Brazilian expatriate sportspeople in Sweden
Brazilian expatriate sportspeople in Mexico
Expatriate footballers in Sweden
Expatriate footballers in Mexico